Stade Théophile Hoarau is a multi-use stadium in Saint-Louis, Réunion.  It is currently used mostly for football matches and serves as the home stadium for SS Saint-Louisienne.  The stadium was founded in 1945 and it holds 2,875 people.

External links
Stade Théophile Hoarau à Saint-Louis - abc-france.com

Football venues in Réunion
SS Saint-Louisienne